This is a list of songs that topped the Belgian Walloon (francophone) Ultratop 40 in 1998.

See also
1998 in music

References

External links
 Ultratop 40

1998 in Belgium
1998 record charts
1998